Kumar Nitesh (born 30 December 1994) is an Indian professional para-badminton player. Having made his international debut in 2016, he became world number 3 in the SL3 category on 14 June 2022. He won his first title at the Irish Para-Badminton International in 2017. In 2019, He started working for Department of Sports and Youth Affairs, Haryana as a Senior Badminton Coach. He currently lives in Karnal, Haryana.

References 

1994 births
Living people
Paralympic athletes of India
Indian disabled sportspeople
Indian male badminton players
Disabled
Sports
Indian male para-badminton players